List of Bihari singers cover singers from Bihar, who sing in the stage, film, album or radio.

K
Bhojpuri cinema
Khesari Lal Yadav

P
Bhojpuri cinema
Pawan Singh

U
Hindi cinema
Udit Narayan

See also
Cinema of Bihar
List of Bhojpuri people
List of Bhojpuri singers

References

Indian singers
Singers